The London station group is a group of 18 railway stations served by the National Rail network in central London. The group contains all 14 terminal stations in central London, either serving major national services or local commuter routes, and 4 other through-stations that are considered terminals for ticketing purposes. All current stations in the group fall within London fare zone 1. A ticket marked "London Terminals" allows travel to any station in the group via any permitted route, as determined by the National Routeing Guide.

Most London terminal stations were developed in the mid-19th century during the initial boom of rail transport. Many stations were built around the edge of central London, stopping at what is now the London Inner Ring Road, because it was prohibitively expensive to build right into the centre, and because each railway was owned by a private company competing with the others. The creation of the London Underground provided a practical connection to the various terminals, which continues to be the case as of the 21st century. Many of the stations have been upgraded and modernised to provide a greater capacity and connections to the network; the first London terminal, London Bridge has been rebuilt and expanded on numerous occasions, and of the major 19th century terminals, only Broad Street and Holborn Viaduct have closed.

The London terminals had a significant impact on the local area. Originally, the demolition of poor properties, particularly south of the River Thames, caused blight and deprived areas around the station. This has changed in the 21st century, where development around the main terminals has been well-received and attracted occupants and businesses.

Definition

Until 1970, railway tickets to London were issued to a specific named terminal. From April of that year, Southern Region terminals were grouped together as a "notional common station" called "LONDON S.R."; tickets issued to this destination were valid to Blackfriars, Cannon Street, Charing Cross, Holborn Viaduct, London Bridge, Vauxhall, Victoria, Waterloo and Waterloo East.   The concept was extended to the rest of London's terminals with effect from British Rail's fares update of May 1983, when the London station group was created: "as part of the progress towards simplification of routes and a reduction of [separate fares] ... a common origin/destination of LONDON BR has been adopted for most London fares". Tickets to the London station group were issued to "LONDON BR" until January 1989, when the name "LONDON BRIT RAIL" was adopted. After the privatisation of British Rail, the name "LONDON" on its own was used from the end of 1997 until April 1998, when the present designation "LONDON TERMINALS" was introduced.

All stations in the London group are in London fare zone 1 and most are at the end of a railway line. In addition, the group includes four stations (and ) that are not technically terminals but are used enough as a destination by National Rail to be considered appropriate as a "London Terminal" for ticketing purposes. The composition of the group has changed several times since 1983, when 18 stations were included: Blackfriars, Broad Street, Cannon Street, Charing Cross, Euston, Fenchurch Street, Holborn Viaduct, Kings Cross, Kings Cross Midland City, Liverpool Street, London Bridge, Marylebone, Moorgate, Paddington, St Pancras, Vauxhall, Victoria and Waterloo. Waterloo East was included separately from January 1984. Two years later, Moorgate was dropped from the group in favour of Old Street, and Kensington Olympia was included; this was in connection with its upgrade in early 1986 to an InterCity station with regular British Rail services from northwest England to the south coast. Moorgate was reinstated as a member of the group in May 1988, and Kensington Olympia was removed from the list in May 1994 as British Rail decided to make fares to and from the station identical to those of neighbouring station .

Tickets issued to "LONDON TERMINALS" can be used to travel from the station of origin to any London terminal that can be reached via a permitted route as defined by the National Routeing Guide. The ticket cannot be used to travel to any station using any non-National Rail modes of transport, including the London Underground, Docklands Light Railway or London Buses. Therefore, a journey from Brighton cannot use a "London Terminals" ticket to travel to Euston or Paddington, as there is no permitted route to them using National Rail services alone. The concept of permitted routes did not exist until the National Routeing Guide was introduced: British Rail used the term "reasonable route", and in respect of the London station group merely stated that journeys between the origin station and London were "subject to normal route availabilities".

Background

The first London terminal stations were built in the late 1830s (starting with London Bridge in 1836) and the early to mid 1840s. Those north of the Thames came up to the edge of richly-developed property that was too expensive to demolish, while property south of the river contained slums and cheap property, making it easier to have terminal stations close to the City and West End, both the main desired areas. In 1846, the Royal Commission on Metropolitan Railway Termini was established to see if it was appropriate to bring the terminal stations any further and possibly connect with each other, as per Pearson's plans. The report concluded this was unnecessary, a single terminal was undesirable as it would create too much congestion and it was too expensive to demolish remaining property in the way.

The Royal Commission recommended that no new stations should be built in the West End of London or the City, and that the New Road should be the northern boundary of railway development. This created competition between the individual railway companies, who could promote new terminals with individual financial backers. The only main railway line built across Central London was the London, Chatham and Dover Railway (LCDR) line connecting Blackfriars to Farringdon via Snow Hill Tunnel in 1866.

Railway construction in London reached a peak between the mid-1850s and 1870s, where an estimated £40 million (£ million as of ) was spent constructing routes around the capital. The competition between terminals led to increased costs and financial overruns. The construction of the LCDR's line via Blackfriars and Farringdon almost bankrupted the company and left it in financial ruin for the rest of its existence. The 1864 Joint Committee on Railway Schemes (Metropolis) decided that, following the success of the underground Metropolitan Railway, that a circular railway should be built to connect the terminals, which eventually became the Circle line, though it was not completed until 1884.

By 1870, the boom in building London terminals had finished. The final one to open was the Great Central Railway's , in 1899.

The problem of connecting the various London terminals was ultimately resolved by the development of the Underground. The Metropolitan Railway, which opened in 1863, was designed to connect Paddington with King's Cross. The Circle Line was designed specifically to connect the London terminals together. As an alternative to the tube, buses have connected the various terminals. In 1928, the Southern Railway, London and North Eastern Railway and Great Western Railway began to provide dedicated buses between their terminals for Pullman and Continental trains. These were taken over by the London Passenger Transport Board (LPTB) upon its formation in 1933, and replaced with regular bus services. From 1936, the LPTB supplied purpose-build 20-seater coaches for this services, with large luggage boots and a flat fare of 1/- (£ as of ). These were suspended during World War II. All stations except Fenchurch Street and Blackfriars provided integrated taxi services on opening. These originally had dedicated access roads to the station platforms when cabs were horse-drawn, while later purpose-built roads were built for road traffic.

In the early 20th century, stations were expanded and upgraded to fit demand. Six terminal stations (Victoria, Waterloo, Euston, Cannon Street, Blackfriars and London Bridge) have been completely rebuilt and London Bridge has seen multiple rebuilds. Although the modern concept of listed buildings had been introduced with the 1947 Town and Country Planning Act 1947, stations were not high priority to be listed. While some had impressive facades and entrances, Victorian stations were not looked upon favourably in the 1960s and had become gradually neglected. One of the most significant examples was the demolition of the Euston Arch in 1962 as part of modernisation works to the station, while the area around Kings Cross became run-down. Similarly, King's Cross and Paddington became Grade I listed in 1954 and 1961 respectively.

In 1986, Broad Street, which had been a major London terminal for local and commuter services, closed. It was feared that Marylebone and St Pancras would follow, but both have been revitalised; the former became an alternative terminal for services to Oxford and Birmingham while the latter is now the main entry point for Eurostar services via the Channel Tunnel.

Cultural impact

The various terminal stations began to affect their surrounding area once built. Those displaced by the railways crammed into whatever existing accommodation was available, creating slums, and the immediate area around the stations were filled with cheap souvenir shops and prostitutes. Conversely, the middle class moved out into suburbs which now had easy access to Central London via train, and railway traffic increased. Around 76,000 people lost their homes between 1853 and 1901 as a direct result of rail expansion. The area around Waterloo had already become notorious for prostitution by the time the station was built, which was eventually cleared away in 1867 when the London and South Western Railway made a compulsory purchase order for the properties and demolished them, to accommodate an expanded station. A significant exception was the later-constructed Marylebone, while Charing Cross was less affected by slum building than neighbouring stations.

The low-income property that was destroyed by building the stations was generally not replaced, and consequently the remaining accommodation became overcrowded. The proliferation of railway lines south of the Thames is why the Underground has more lines north of the river, as it did not have alternative overground services.

In contrast to the 19th century impact of stations, newer developments have seen gentrification of the areas around them. Both Kings Cross and St Pancras stations have been modernised in the 21st century, and are now better regarded. Many goods sheds have been removed, and the area surrounding the stations includes a natural swimming pool, and numerous new apartments.

The four former London and North Eastern Railway terminals (King's Cross, Marylebone, Fenchurch Street and Liverpool Street) are the stations on a standard British Monopoly board.

Group members

Current stations

Former stations

See also

 List of London railway stations

References
Notes

Citations

Sources

External links
 How London's Terminal Stations Got Their Names – Londonist
 How many railway terminals does London have? – City Metric

 
 
Rail transport stations in London fare zone 1
Rail infrastructure in London